Mudu in Iran may refer to:
 Mudu, Yazd